Lucilectric was a German pop/rock duo founded in 1993 by Luci van Org and producer . They are known primarily for their 1994 hit single "Mädchen" ("Girl"), which spent 12 weeks in the German Top 10, eventually reaching number two. The single also charted in the Swiss, Austrian and Dutch markets. Hey Süßer (Hey sweetheart), another of single from the same album, also reached the Top 40 in 1994. Lucilectric would go on to record two more albums and eventually separated in 1999.

History
Other similar groups from that same period which attained bigger commercial success through the decade and beyond include Tic Tac Toe and Die Prinzen. Although popular, Lucilectric were criticized at the time by some observers of German culture to be representative of the "trivialization of femininity".

After Lucilectric, Luci van Org would go on to work as a television presenter and host. In 2001 she formed the gothic alternative band Übermutter, while Goldkind continued to produce music, most notably for Nina Hagen and Die Fantastischen Vier

Discography

Singles

Awards
 BAMBI (1994)
 ECHO - Single of the Year for "Mädchen" (1995)

Notes

References

 .

External links
 Concert photos at RockPalast
 Alles Luci - unofficial site with bio information and photographs
 Lucilectric at KulturLaden

German pop music groups
German rock music groups
German musical duos
Rock music duos
Musical groups established in 1993
Musical groups disestablished in 1999
1993 establishments in Germany